Edward Riley Boyd (November 25, 1914 – July 13, 1994) was an American blues pianist, singer and songwriter, best known for his recordings in the early 1950s, including the number one R&B chart hit "Five Long Years".

Life and career
Boyd was born either on Stovall's Plantation, near Clarksdale, Mississippi, or on Frank Moore's Plantation, near Stovall, Mississippi. He learned to play the guitar and the piano. His piano playing was influenced by the styles of Roosevelt Sykes and Leroy Carr.

Boyd moved to the Beale Street district of Memphis, Tennessee, in 1936, where he played with his group, the Dixie Rhythm Boys. He then joined the Great Migration of African Americans north to the factories of Chicago in 1941. He recorded for Bluebird Records, accompanying such musicians as Sonny Boy Williamson, Jazz Gillum, Muddy Waters, and Tampa Red, before making his first recordings under his own name, in 1947.

He decided to produce his own recordings, and took two demos to Joe Brown at J.O.B. Records, who agreed to re-record the tracks. In May 1952 he recorded "Five Long Years", which became a huge hit, topping the Billboard R&B chart for seven weeks late in the year. He signed with Parrot Records, which then sold his contract to Chess Records. Boyd had two further hits for Chess in 1953, "24 Hours" and "Third Degree" (co-written by Willie Dixon), both of which reached number three on the R&B chart.

He went on to record for a series of smaller labels in the 1950s, but an automobile accident in 1957 in which he was injured put his career on hold for a while. Boyd toured Europe with Buddy Guy's band in 1965 as part of the American Folk Blues Festival. He later toured and recorded with Fleetwood Mac and John Mayall & the Bluesbreakers.

Unhappy with the racial discrimination faced in the United States, Boyd moved to Belgium, where he recorded with the Dutch band Cuby and the Blizzards. He moved again, in 1970, to Helsinki, Finland, where he continued to perform and recorded ten blues records, the first being Praise to Helsinki (1970). He married his wife, Leila, in 1977.

Boyd died in 1994 at the Meilahti Hospital in Helsinki. He was buried in the St. Lawrence Church's cemetery in Vantaa. A few months later, Eric Clapton's chart-topping blues album From the Cradle, which includes interpretations of Boyd's "Five Long Years" and "Third Degree", was released.

Discography

Studio albums
Five Long Years (Fontana, 1966)
Praise the Blues - Cuby + Blizzards & Eddie Boyd (Philips, 1967)
Eddie Boyd and His Blues Band Featuring Peter Green (Decca, 1967) 
7936 South Rhodes (Blue Horizon, 1968) 
Praise to Helsinki (Love Records, 1970)
The Legacy of the Blues, vol. 10 (Sonet, 1974)
Brotherhood (Finnish Blues Society, 1975)
My Lady (Lobo, 1978)
Soulful (Magic Angel, 1980)
A Sad Day (Paris, 1980)
Lover's Playground (Stockholm, 1984)

Live album
Eddie Boyd Live (Storyville, 1976)

Compilations
Vacation from the Blues (Jefferson, 1976)
Rattin' and Runnin' Around (Crown Prince, 1981)
No More of This Third Degree (Teldec, 1982)
The Best of Eddie Boyd (P-Vine, 1984)
Third Degree (Orbis/Charly, 1993)
The Complete Recordings, vols. 1 and 2 (EPM, 2001, 2004)
Eddie Boyd in Finland (Blue North, 2005)
The Blues Is Here to Stay (Jasmine, 2013)
Vacation from the Blues (Mojo, 2015)

Charting singles
"Five Long Years" (J.O.B., 1952)
"24 Hours" (Chess, 1953)
"Third Degree" (Chess, 1953)

Guest appearances
With Magic Sam
Give Me Time (Delmark, 1991; recorded 1968)

Notes

References

1914 births
1994 deaths
Musicians from Clarksdale, Mississippi
Chicago blues musicians
American blues pianists
American male pianists
Blues musicians from Mississippi
African-American pianists
Columbia Records artists
Chess Records artists
20th-century American pianists
People from Shelby, Mississippi
American expatriates in Finland
Deaths in Finland
20th-century American male musicians
20th-century African-American musicians